Felman Larry St. Thomas (January 17, 1919 – April 20, 1992) was an American baseball catcher in the Negro leagues. He played with the Newark Eagles in 1943 and the New York Black Yankees in 1947.

References

External links
 and Seamheads

1919 births
1992 deaths
Baseball players from Georgia (U.S. state)
Baseball catchers
Newark Eagles players
New York Black Yankees players
Sportspeople from Georgia (U.S. state)
20th-century African-American sportspeople